Protein phosphatase 1 regulatory subunit 11 is an enzyme that in humans is encoded by the PPP1R11 gene.

This gene encodes a specific inhibitor of protein phosphatase-1 (PP1) with a differential sensitivity toward the metal-independent and metal-dependent forms of PP1. 

The gene is located within the major histocompatibility complex class I region on chromosome 6.

References

Further reading